Mu Andromedae (Mu And, μ Andromedae, μ And) is the Bayer designation for a star in the northern constellation of Andromeda. It has an apparent visual magnitude of 3.87, making it readily visible to the naked eye. In the constellation, the star is situated about halfway between the bright star Mirach to the southwest and the Andromeda Galaxy (M31) to the northeast.

The spectrum of this star matches a stellar classification of A5 V, indicating that it is an A-type main sequence star. It has double the mass of the Sun and 2.4 times the Sun's radius. The star is radiating about 21 times the luminosity of the Sun from its outer envelope at an effective temperature of 7,959 K, giving it the characteristic white glow of an A-type star. It is estimated to be about 600 million years old, with a relatively high projected rotational velocity of 75 km/s. Mu Andromedae has recently been found to be a binary system. The two stars orbit each other every 550.7 days.

Naming

References

External links
 http://www.alcyone-software.com/cgi-bin/search.pl?object=HR0269 
 Image μ Andromedae

Andromeda (constellation)
A-type main-sequence stars
Andromedae, Mu
Andromedae, 37
0269
005448
BD+37 0175
004436
Binary stars